Morality is, “The ability to distinguish right from wrong, to act on this distinction and to experience pride when we do the right things and guilt or shame when we do not.” Both Piaget and Kohlberg made significant contributions to this area of study. Developmental psychologists have divided the subject of morality into three main topics: affective element, cognitive element, and behavioral element. The affective element consists of the emotional response to actions that may be considered right or wrong. This is the emotional part of morality that covers the feeling of guilt as well as empathy. The cognitive element focuses on how people use social cognitive processes to determine what actions are right or wrong. For example, if an eight-year-old child was informed by an authoritative adult not to eat the cookies in the jar and then was left in the room alone with the cookies the child may want a cookie, however also recognize they may get in trouble. The behavioral element targets how people behave when they are being enticed to deceive or when they are assisting someone who needs help.

Moral Affect 

Moral affect is “emotion related to matters of right and wrong”. Such emotion includes shame, guilt, embarrassment, and pride; shame is correlated with the disapproval by one's peers, guilt is correlated with the disapproval of oneself, embarrassment is feeling disgraced while in the public eye, and pride is a feeling generally brought about by a positive opinion of oneself when admired by one's peers 

Empathy is also tied in with moral affect and is an emotional unfolding that allows you to be able to understand how another person feels. If an empathetic person sees someone crying, then they may understand their sadness. If the empathetic person sees someone that has just accomplished a lifelong goal, they may understand their happiness. Empathy falls under the affective component of morality and is the main reasoning behind selflessness. According to theorist Martin Hoffman, empathy plays a key role in the progression of morality. Empathy causes people to be more prominent in prosocial behavior as discussed earlier. Without empathy, there would be no humanity.

Moral Reasoning 

Moral reasoning is the thinking process involved in deciding whether an act is right or wrong. This allows the development of social cognition that helps us experience other people's distress. These skills also allow us to go beyond our egocentrism to construct a concept of reciprocity and fairness. According to Piaget and Kohlberg, moral reasoning progresses through a constant sequence, a very fixed and universal order of stages, each of which contains a consistent way of thinking about moral issues that are all distinct from one another.

Jean Piaget's view 

Jean Piaget's view: Jean Piaget  was the first psychologist to suggest a theory of moral development. According to Piaget, development only emerges with action, and a person constructs and reconstructs his knowledge of the world as the result of new interactions with his environment. Piaget said that people pass through three different stages of moral reasoning: Premoral period, heteronomous morality, and Autonomous morality. The first stage, premoral, occurs during the preschool years: children show very little awareness or understanding of rules and cannot be considered moral beings. The next stage, heteronomous which is defined as under the rule of another, and it involves children ages 6 to 10 years old. The child will take rules more seriously, believing that they are handed down by authority figures and are sacred and never to be altered. No matter if the intentions were good or bad, any violator to these passed-down rules will be judged as wrongdoing. The last stage, Autonomous, appears at 10 to 11 years of age. Children begin to appreciate that rules are agreements between individuals.

Lawrence Kohlberg's view 

Lawrence Kohlberg's view: Influenced by Piaget's work, Kohlberg created an influential cognitive development theory of moral development. Like Piaget, Kohlberg formulated that moral growth occurs in a very universal and consistent sequence of three moral levels, but for him the stages in the sequence are connected with one another, and grows out of the preceding stage. Kohlberg's view represents a more complex way of thinking about moral issues.

Stages of Moral Reasoning 

The first level of Kohlberg's moral reasoning is called preconventional morality. In this stage, children obey rules more externally. This means the children are more likely to conform to rules authority sets for them, to avoid punishment or to receive personal rewards. There are two stages within preconventional morality. The first is punishment and obedience orientation. During this stage, the child determines how wrong his action was according to the punishment they receive. If he does not get scolded for his bad act, they will believe he did nothing wrong. The second stage of preconventional morality is called instrumental hedonism. The main principle for this stage is quid pro quo. A person in the second stage conforms to rules for personal gain. There is a hint of understanding the ruler's perspective, although, the main objective is to gain the benefit in return.

The next level is conventional morality. At this level, many moral values have been internalized by the individual. they work to obey rules set by authority and to seek approval. The points of views of others are now clearly recognized and taken into serious consideration. The first stage to this level is labeled “good boy” or “good girl” morality. The following stage captures the golden rule “treat others the way you want to be treated.” The emphasis in this stage consists of being nice and meaning well. What is seen as “good” is now what pleases and helps others. The last stage of this level is “Authority and social order- maintaining morality.” This is conforming to set rules created by legitimate authorities that benefits society as a whole. The basis of reciprocation is growing more complex. The purpose of conforming is no longer based on the fear of punishment, but on the value people place on respecting law and doing one's duty for society.

The final level of moral reasoning is postconventional morality. The individual determines what the moral ideal for society is. The individual will begin to distinguish between what is morally acceptable and what is legal. He will recognize some laws violate basic moral principles. He will go beyond perspectives of social groups or authorities and will start to accept the perspectives of all points of view around the world. In the first stage of postconventional, called “morality of contract, individual rights and democratic accepted law”, all people willingly work towards benefitting everyone. They understand all social groups within a society have different values, but believe all intellectual individuals would agree on two points. First point being freedom of liberty and life. Second, they would agree to having democratic vote for changing unfair laws and improving their society. The final stage of the final level of Kohlberg's moral reasoning is “morality of individual principles of conscience”, At this highest stage of moral reasoning, Kohlberg defines his stage 6 subjects as having a clear and broad concept of universal principles. The stage 6 thinker does not create the basis for morality. Instead, they explore, through self-evaluation, complex principles of respect for all individuals and for their rights that all religions or moral authorities would view as moral. Kohlberg stopped using stage 6 in his scoring manual, saying it was a “theoretical stage”. He began to score postconventional responses only up to stage 5.

Moral Behavior: The Social Learning Theory 

The Social Learning Theory is based on the observing of others and modeling behaviors, emotions and attitude of others. This theory is derived from the concept or perspective of behaviorism but has elements of cognitive learning as well. The theory says that people and especially children learn from observing others and their environment around them. It also says that imitation or modeling has a major role in learning and development of the person and their beliefs or morals. Albert Bandura was a major contributor to the theory of social learning and made many contributions to the field with social experiments and research. The social learning theory says that children learn and develop morals from observing what is around them and having role models that they imitate their behavior and learn from. Role models guide children indirectly with developing morals and morality. By watching the response of others and society around them, children learn what is acceptable and what is not acceptable and try to act similar to what is deemed acceptable by the society around them.

For example, a child's older sibling tends to serve as one of their first role models, especially because they share the same surroundings and authority figures. When the older child misbehaves or does something unacceptable the younger child takes the older one as an example and acts like him or her. However, if the parent punishes the older child or there is a consequence to their behavior, the younger child often does not act like the older one because they were able to observe that that behavior was “unacceptable” by the “society” surrounding them, meaning their family. This example coincides with the fact that children know that stealing, killing, and lying is bad, and honesty, kindness, and being polite is good.

Functions of Morality: Evolutionary Theory 

The Evolutionary Theory of Morality tries to explain morality and its development in terms of evolution and how it may at first seem contradictory for humans to have morals and morality in the evolutionary opinion. Evolution has many beliefs and parts to it but as most commonly seen, it is the survival of the fittest. This behavior is driven from the desire to pass on your genes. Whether that means being selfish or caring for your young just to make sure that your genes survive. That may seem to conflict with morality and having morals, however some argue that that may be related and having morality and morals might actually be a factor that contributes to the theory of evolution. Additionally, humans have developed communities and a social lifestyle which makes it necessary to develop morals. In an evolutionary view, a human being that acts immorally will suffer consequences, such as paying a fine, going to prison, or being an outcast. Whatever it is, there is a loss to that human. Therefore, that individual eventually learns that to be accepted in society, it is necessary to develop morals and act on them.

The Infant 
An infant is not held accountable for wrongdoings because an infant is considered to be amoral. Infants do not have the ability to understand morality at this stage of their life. Infancy ranges from birth to the age of two. It is during this time that infants learn how to be prosocial and empathetic by observing those around them.

Early moral training 

An example of early moral training is given by Roger Burton. Roger Burton observed his 1-year-old daughter Ursula take her sister's Halloween candy. The older sister quickly scolded the infant for doing so. After a week had passed the infant went and stole candy again but was confronted by her mother this time. Yet again the infant stole her sister's candy, so Burton approached his daughter himself. As Burton was about to say something to Ursula, she spoke and said, “No this is Maria's, not Ursula's.” This specific example given by Burton shows how the infant grows and imputes morality slowly but surely. Over time infants start to understand that their behavior can cause repercussions. The infants learn by observing their surrounding environment. A 1-year-old may cease to commit a certain action because of feelings of apprehension due to past experiences of criticism. Both disapproval and reward are key factors in furthering the infants' development. If a baby is especially close to his mom, her disapproval and reward are that much more impactful in this process than it would be for a baby who was unattached to his mom. Infants are excellent at reading the emotions of others which in turn directs them in knowing what is good and what is bad. A strong attachment between parent and infant is the key to having success with the infants' socialization. If the relationship between the two is not stable by 15 months, at 4 the child will show animosity and troublesome behavior. At 5 the child is likely to show signs of destructive behavior. In order to ensure this does not happen, a mutually responsive orientation among the parent and offspring is necessary. Meaning, “A close emotionally positive and cooperative relationship in which child and care giver cares about each other and are sensitive to each other's needs.”  With this bond, parents can help their child's conscience grow.

Empathy and Prosocial Behavior 

Empathy and Prosocial Behavior: Unlike what Freud, Kohlberg, and Piaget said about infants being focused solely on themselves, Krebs's has a different take on the infant. Krebs's outlook on infants is that they can and do express signs of empathy and prosocial behavior. After being born, newborns show empathy in a primitive way by showing signs of agony when hearing other babies cry. Although it is not certain whether these babies can tell the difference between their own cry and another infants, Martin Hoffman explains that between the age of 1 and 2 infants are more able to perform real moral acts. Hoffman observed a 2-year-old's reaction to another child in distress. The 2-year-old offered his own teddy bear to his peer. This simple act shows that the 2-year-old was putting himself in the shoes of his peer  Another study was done by Carolyn Zahn-Waxler and her team on this topic. Waxler found that over half of the infants involved took part in at least one act of prosocial behavior  Hoffman feels that as children mature empathy in turn becomes less about oneself and more about cognitive development.

The Child 

Kohlberg contributed to our understanding of moral development in children and said that moral reasoning is what makes ethical behavior. He said that there are six developmental stages that are constructive that eventually lead to the development of morality. Kohlberg also said that moral development does not just stop or is complete at a certain time or stage but instead that it is continuous and happens throughout a person's lifetime. Kohlberg used stories that are known as Heinz dilemmas which are controversial stories to see what people felt was morally acceptable and what was not. From that he developed his theory with his six stages of moral development which are: obedience, self-interest, conformity, law and order, human rights, and universal human ethics.

Weighing Intentions 

As mentioned before, Kohlberg believed that moral development was an ongoing thing and that through experiences it develops and adapts. Moreover, in children's moral thinking there comes a time where morality and moral decisions are made based on consequences, that is to say that they start weighing intentions in order to decide and learn whether something is morally okay or not.

An example of this can be seen in identifying the intentions of specific behaviors. We as a society also operate in that way because the same outcome or behavior can be considered acceptable had the intentions for it been good versus another time where the intentions were bad and in that case it would be unacceptable. In a situation where a child is trying to help their parent clean and misplaces something accidentally, it is easily forgiven and is considered morally acceptable because his/her intentions were good. However, if the child purposely hid the object so their parent would not find it, it is morally unacceptable because the intentions were bad. Ultimately, it is the same situation and same outcome but the intentions are different. At the age of 10–11 years children realize this concept and start justifying their actions and behaviors by weighing their intentions.

Understanding Rules 

In Kohlberg's theory of moral development there are six definite stages. The first stage is called obedience and punishment orientation. And this stage is governed by the concept of having rules, laws, and things that one must follow. In children there is a set of rules set down by their authority figures, often being their parents. At this stage of moral development, morality is defined by these rules and laws that they think are set in stone and can never change. To a child, these rules are ones that can never be wrong and that define good and bad and show the difference between them. Later on however, these rules become more like guidelines and can change based on the situation they are presented in. Another aspect of these rules is the concept of punishment and reinforcement and that's how children realize what is considered morally okay or not.

An example of this is in the dilemmas used by Kohlberg, when he asked children to justify or judge the situation and their answer was always justified by something similar to “this is not fair” or “this is wrong because lying is bad” etc. This shows that at this particular stage children are not yet contributing members in terms of moral development.

Applying Theory of Mind 

The theory of mind tells us that children need to develop a sense of self in order to develop morality and moral concepts. As the child develops, s/he needs to experience and observe in order to realize how they fit into society and eventually become part of it thereby establishing a sense of self-identity. This sense of self-identity depends on many things and it is important to develop and learn from those stages in order to fully develop understand good from bad.

Moral Socialization 

Moral socialization talks about how morality is passed on. This perspective says that adults or parents pass down and teach their children the acceptable behavior through techniques and teaching as well as punishments and reinforcements. This then shows that children who learn and develop morality have good listening and are more compliant and it is because of that that they are morally developed. Therefore, if a parent fails to teach that to their child, the child then would not develop morality. Moral socialization also has studies that show that parents who use techniques that are not violent or aggressive and unconditional raise children with more conscience. Therefore, these children have more of a sense of morality and are more morally developed.

The Adolescent 

As adolescents gain the ability to independently think about complex and hypothetical ideas, and as they map out their identities, many of them begin to see their values and moral standards and some centralize on their morality. On the other side of the spectrum there are the adolescents who engage in serious antisocial behavior.

Changes in moral reasoning 

The teen years are a significant period for moral growth. The moral reasoning percentage range displays that the preconventional reasoning (stage one and two) decrease rapidly as they reach teen years. During adolescence, conventional reasoning (stage three and four) become the centralized mode of moral thinking. Early year teens reflect stage 2 (instrumental hedonism) - “treat others how you would like to be treated”- or stage 3 (good boy or good girl) which involves earning approval and being polite. Almost half the percent of 16- to 18-year-olds display stage 3 reasoning and only a fifth were scored as stage 4 (authority and social order-maintaining morality) arguments. As adolescents start to age more they begin to take a broad societal perspective and act in ways to benefit the social system. The main developmental trend in moral reasoning occurs during the shift from preconventional to conventional reasoning. During the shift, individuals carry out moral standards that have been passed down by authority. Many teens characterize a moral person as caring fair, and honest. Adolescents who display these aspects tend to advance their moral reasoning.

Antisocial behavior 

The adolescents who do not internalize society's moral standards, are more likely to be involved in antisocial conduct such as, muggings, rapes, armed robberies, etc. Most antisocial adults start their bad behavior in childhood and continue on into adolescence. Misbehavior seen in childhood increases, resulting in juvenile delinquency as adolescents. Actions such as leaving school early, having difficulty maintaining a job, and later participating in law-breaking as adults. Children who are involved in these risky activities are diagnosed as having conduct disorder and will later develop antisocial personality disorder. There are at least two outcomes of antisocial youths. First, a noticeable group of children who are involved in animal cruelty, and violence amongst their peers which then consistently progresses throughout their entire lifespan. The second group consists of the larger population of adolescents who misbehave primarily due to peer pressure but outgrow this behavior when they reach adulthood. Juveniles are most likely to depend on preconventional moral reasoning. Some offenders lack a well-developed sense of right and wrong. A majority of delinquents are able to reason conventionally but commit illegal acts anyway.

Dodge's social information processing model 

Kenneth Dodge progressed on the understanding of aggressive/aggression behavior with creating his social information processing model. He believed that people's retaliation to frustration, anger or provocation do not depend so much on social cues in the situation as on the ways which they process and interpret this information. An individual who is provoked goes through a six step progress of processing information. According to dodge the individual will encode and interpret cues, then clarify goals. Following this, he will respond search and decision, thinking of possible actions to achieve goal to then weigh pros and cons of alternative options. Finally, he will perform behavioral enactment, or take action. People do not go through these steps in the exact order in all cases, they may take two and work on them simultaneously or repeat the steps. Also, an individual may come up with information from not only the current situation, but also from a previous similar social experience and work off of that. The six steps in social information processing advance as one ages.

Patterson's coercive family environments 

Gerald Patterson observed that highly antisocial children and adolescents tend to be raised in coercive family environments in which family members try to control the others through negative, coercive tactics. The parental guidance in these households realize they are able to control their children temporarily with threatening them and providing negative reinforcement. The child also learns to use negative reinforcement to get what they want by ignoring, whining and throwing tantrums. Eventually, both sides (parents and children) lose all power of the situation and nothing is resolved. It becomes evident of how a child is raised on how they will become very hostile or present aggressiveness to resolve all their disputes. Patterson discusses how growing up in a coercive family environment creates an antisocial adolescent due to the fact they are already unpleasant to be around they begin to perform poorly in school and are rejected to all their peers. With no alternative option, they turn to the low-achieving, antisocial youths who encourage bad behavior. Dodge's theory is well supported by many cases of ineffective parenting contributing to the child's behavior problems, association with antisocial groups, resulting in antisocial behavior in adolescence.

Nature and nurture 

The next theory that may contribute to antisocial behavior is between genetic predisposition and social learning experiences. Aggression is seen more in the evolutionary aspect. An example being, males are more aggressive than females and are involved in triple the amount of crime. Aggression has been present in males for centuries due to male dependence on dominance to compete for mates and pass genes to further generations. Most individuals are born with temperaments, impulsive tendencies, and other characteristics that relate to a delinquent. Although predisposed aspects have a great effect on the adolescent's behavior, if the child grows up in a dysfunctional family and receive poor parenting or is involved in an abusive environment that will increase the chances immensely for antisocial behaviors to appear.

The Adult

Changes in Moral Reasoning 

Lawrence Kohlberg has led most of the studies based on moral development in adults. In Kohlberg's studies, the subjects are ranked accordingly at one of the six stages. Stage 1 is called the Obedience and Punishment Orientation. Stage 1 is preconventional morality because the subject sees morality in an egocentric way. Stage 2 is also considered to be preconventional morality and is labeled as Individualism and Exchange. At this stage, the individual is still concentrated on the self and his surrounding environment. Stages 3 and 4 are at level 2, Conventional Morality. Stage 3 is called Interpersonal Relationships and is the point where the individual realizes that people should behave in good ways not only for the benefit of themselves but the family and community as well. Stage 4, Maintaining the Social Order, the individual is more concentrated on society as a whole. Stage 5 and 6 are both at level 3, post-conventional Morality. Stage 5 is the social contract and Individual Rights. At this stage people are contemplating what makes a good society rather than just what makes a society run smoothly. Stage 6, Universal Principles is the last stage which interprets the foundation of justice  Kohlberg completed a 20-year study and found that most 30-year-old adults were at stage 3 and 4, the conventional level. According to this study there is still room for moral development in adulthood.

Kohlberg's Theory in Perspective 

Kohlberg's theory of moral development greatly influenced the scientific body of knowledge. That being said, it is now being evaluated and researchers are looking for a more thorough explanation of moral development. Kohlberg stated that there is no variation to his stages of development. Despite this, modern research explains that children are more morally mature than Kohlberg had noted. On top of that, there is no strong evidence to suggest that people go from conventional to postconventional. Lastly, it is now known that Kohlberg's theory is biased against numerous people.

New Approaches to Morality 

The main focus of developmentalists now is how important emotion is in terms of morality. Developmental researchers are examining the emotions of children and adults when exhibiting good and bad behavior. The importance of innate feelings and hunches in regards to morality are also being contemplated by doctors. Researchers have also come up with dual-process models of morality. This process examines Kohlberg's rational deliberation as well as the more recent study of innate feelings and emotions. Joshua Green is one scholar who backs the dual-process models of morality and feels that there are different situations that call for each view. All in all, there are many factors that come into play in deciding whether a person will behave in a certain fashion when dealing with a moral decision.

References

 Sigelman, Carol K., and David R. Shaffer. Life-span Human Development. Pacific Grove, CA: Brooks/Cole Pub., 1991. Print
McAlister, A. J., & Owen, S. V. (2006). Mechanisms of moral disengagement. Journal of 
Social and Clinical Psychology.
Crain, W. C. (1985). Theories of development. (2nd ed., pp. 118–136). New York: Prentice-Hall.
 Baron-Cohen, S. (2006). Cognition and development. Retrieved from https://web.archive.org/web/20130712094632/http://psychology4a.com/develop13.htm
Miller, R. (2011). Moral development in childhood. Global Post: America's World News 
Site.
Slavin, R. E. (2003). Educational 	Psychology: Theory and Practice, 7e.  Boston, MA. Allyn and Bacon.
W.C. Crain. (1985). Theories of Development. Prentice-Hall. pp. 118–136
Thompson, Ross A. "Understanding Values in Relationship: The Development of Conscience." (n.d.): n. pag. Web.</references>

Moral psychology